Jan Mombaer also known as Johannes Mauburnus and as Johannes von Brüssel (1460, Brussels – 1501 Paris) was a Christian monk who composed hymns and was part of the devotio moderna movement.

He studied at the congregation of Augustinians in Utrecht and around 1477 entered the Congregation of Windesheim. Mombaer developed a structured method of organizing seemingly haphazard glances at the Bible to form consistent thoughts for a hymn. His work was also treasured by Martin Luther. As an Augustinian monk, Luther used Mauburnus' morning prayer upon rising. Later he used that prayer in crafting what many today know as "Luther's Morning Prayer" found in Luther's Small Catechism. Mombaer is best known for his Rosetum exercitiorum spiritualium et sacrarum meditationum (Rose-garden of spiritual exercises and sacred meditations) mentioned by Loyola as an influence on his own spiritual exercises.

References

External links
 Original text of the Rosetum at the University of Düsseldorf.

1460 births
1501 deaths
15th-century Dutch Roman Catholic theologians
Burgundian Netherlands Roman Catholic clergy